Erich Czerwonski (1889–1940) was a German art director. He designed the sets for around a hundred productions during his career. He died in 1940 after being struck by a train during a blackout.

Filmography

 The Black Panther (1921)
 Barmaid (1922)
 Phantom (1922)
 Lust for Life (1922)
 A Glass of Water (1923)
 The Princess Suwarin (1923)
 The Expulsion (1923)
 The Grand Duke's Finances (1924)
 My Leopold (1924)
 The Gentleman Without a Residence (1925)
 The Telephone Operator (1925)
 The Boxer's Bride (1926)
 The Fiddler of Florence (1926)
 The Great Leap (1927)
 His Late Excellency (1927)
 The Woman in the Cupboard (1927)
 Eva and the Grasshopper (1927)
 Grand Hotel (1927)
 You Walk So Softly (1928)
 Panic (1928)
 The Lady with the Mask (1928)
 Scandal in Baden-Baden (1929)
 Favorite of Schonbrunn (1929)
 Never Trust a Woman (1930)
 Delicatessen (1930)
 The Trunks of Mr. O.F. (1931)
 Chauffeur Antoinette (1932)
 Five from the Jazz Band (1932)
 A Tremendously Rich Man (1932)
 Trenck (1932)
 There Is Only One Love (1933)
 The Big Bluff (1933)
 Zwei im Sonnenschein (1933)
 Such a Rascal (1934)
 Miss Madame (1934)
 Love Conquers All (1934)
 Hearts are Trumps (1934)
 Rivalen der Luft (1934)
 Es tut sich was um Mitternacht (1934)
 ...heute abend bei mir (1934)
 Miss Liselott (1934)
 Ich sehne mich nach dir (1934)
 A Waltz for You (1934)
 Da stimmt was nicht (1934)
 Light Cavalry (1935)
  (1935)
 Warum lügt Fräulein Käthe? (1935)
 Lärm um Weidemann (1935)
 Game on Board (1936)
 Herbstmanöver (1936)
 Scandal at the Fledermaus (1936)
 Heiratsinstitut Ida & Co (1937)
 Dangerous Crossing (1937)
 Tango Notturno (1937)
 Mädchen für alles (1937)
 Gordian the Tyrant (1937)
 Der Lachdoktor (1937)
 Schüsse in Kabine 7 (1938)
 Shadows Over St. Pauli (1938)
 Freight from Baltimore (1938)
The Secret Lie (1938)
 Secret Code LB 17 (1938)
 Kennwort Machin (1939)
 Midsummer Night's Fire (1939)
 Uproar in Damascus (1939)
 Hochzeit mit Hindernissen (1939)
 The Merciful Lie (1939)
 Weißer Flieder (1940)
 Achtung! Feind hört mit! (1940)
 My Daughter Doesn't Do That (1940)
 Herz ohne Heimat (1940)

References

Bibliography
 Kreimeier, Klaus. The Ufa Story: A History of Germany's Greatest Film Company, 1918-1945. University of California Press, 1999.

External links

1889 births
1940 deaths
German art directors
Film people from Berlin
Railway accident deaths in Germany